Vanchinatha Iyer (1886 – 17 June 1911), popularly known as Vanchinathan or Vanchi, was an Indian independence activist.
He is best remembered for assassinating Robert Ashe, the Tax Collector of Thirunelveli who was instrumental in closing V.O.Chidambaram Pillai’s Swadeshi Shipping Company and arresting him.

Personal life 
Vanchinathan was born in 1886 in Sengottai to Raghupathy Iyer and Rukmani Ammal in a Tamil Brahmin family. His actual name was Shankaran. He did his schooling in Sengottai. He married Ponnammal and got into a lucrative government job.

Indian Freedom Movement 
On 17 June 1911, Vanchi who was  25, assassinated Robert Ashe, the district collector of Tirunelveli, who was also known as Collector Dorai.  He shot Ashe at point-blank range when Ashe's train had stopped at the Maniyachi Station, en route to Madras. He committed suicide thereafter. The railway station has since been renamed Vanchi Maniyachi.

Assassination of Ashe
The mastermind behind the assassination was Nilakanta Brahmachari who went around the Madras presidency in 1910 recruiting cadres and hatching plots against the British. In this venture, he was accompanied by Shankar Krishna Iyer, Vanchinathan's brother-in-law, who introduced the men to each other. Along with a few other men, Nilakanta Bramhachari, Vaanchinathan, and Shankar Krishna Aiyar found an organisation called Bharatha Matha Sangam which plots the assassination of influential British men.   
On 17 June 1911, Ashe boarded the 9:30 am Maniyachi Mail at Tirunelveli Junction. With him was his wife, Mary Lillian Patterson, who had arrived from Ireland only a few days earlier. They had married on 6 April 1898, in Berhampore; Mary was about a year older than Ashe. They were on their way to Kodaikanal where their four children, Molly, Arthur, Sheila, and Herbert, lived in a rented bungalow.
At 10:38 am, the train pulled in at Maniyachi. The Ceylon Boat Mail was due to arrive at 10:48 am. As the Ashes sat facing each other in the first class carriage, waiting for the Boat Mail to arrive, a neatly dressed man with tufted hair and another young man wearing a dhoti approached the carriage. The former boarded the carriage and pulled out a Belgian-made Browning automatic pistol. The bullet hit Ashe in the chest and he collapsed. The sound of the pistol shot was absorbed by the howling wind.

After the shooting, Vanchinathan ran along the platform and took cover in the latrine. Sometime later he was found dead, having shot himself in the mouth. The pistol recovered from him was empty without any bullets as he just planned to kill himself after killing Ashe and had no intention to hurt anyone other than Ashe In his pocket was found the  following letter:

Vanchi was a close collaborator of Varahaneri Venkatesa Subrahmanya Iyer (normally shortened to V.V.S.Aiyar or Va.Ve.Su Iyer), another activist who sought arms to defeat the British. He trained Vanchinathan to execute the plan in all perfection. They belonged to Bharatha Matha Association.

The Tamil Nadu Government  built a memorial in Sengottai at his birthplace.

Controversy behind the motive
The contents of the letter that was retrieved from Vanchi Iyer post his suicide indicates that the murder was religious and caused great apprehension on the Ashe's activities against social evils. The timing of the assassination indicated a protest against the impending coronation. Many outfits in Tamil Nadu allege that Vanchi Iyer was a casteist and he killed Ashe because he was interfering with the Brahminism. According to M Sivasubramaniam, this has no historic proof as per the official British records and proceedings of the court.

Recent developments 
In recent years, the Dalit (traditionally marginalized groups in India) perception of Ashe has been positive and is considered as a hero. Ashe took action to ensure that all people could take a bath in the Courtallam waterfalls, which until then had been reserved exclusively for the upper caste Indians and for the bathing of idols of deities. This action has opened up the waterfalls for the Dalit people. In recent years, Dalit organizations have paid tribute to Ashe on his birthday by offering floral tributes to his memorial and to his grave, which is situated in the English Church, opposite the St. John's College in Palayamkottai. According to K. G. Kalaikannan, Tirunelveli district secretary of Athi Tamilar Peravai, they gave floral tributes to Robert Ashe in order to challenge the common view that Vanchinatha Iyer is a freedom fighter and to help other people know the actual reason for Vanchinatha Iyer's murder of Ashe. In Kalaikannan's version, "Vanchinatha Iyer was frustrated by Ashe's wife, Mary Lillian Patterson, who supported a pregnant outcast woman who needed urgent medical attention to move through agraharam. To secure the Brahminical set-up, he killed Ashe.

Legacy 
In the film Kappalottiya Thamizhan, Actor Balaji played the role of Vanchinathan. Bharathiyar song "Kaattru veliyedai kannamma".. was picturised with Gemini Ganesan and Savitri. Sivaji Ganesan played the role of V. O. Chidambaram Pillai.
The Maniyachchi Railway Station where Vanchinathan shot Ashe, was renamed to Vanchi Maniyachchi Junction Railway Station in remembrance of him.

Controversy 
The Hindu (Tamil) published an article based, what it said, on an interview with Jayakrishnan, who claimed to be the grandson of Vanchinathan. It was said in the article that Jayakrishnan blamed (his grandfather) Vanchinathan for neglecting his wife who was 8 months pregnant at that time. Jayakrishnan has purportedly said "What he (Vanchinathan) did was wrong". Writer Jayamohan has written an article on his website that the article has given wrong information as there were no descendants to Vanchinathan. The only girl child he had, died as an infant while he was still alive. He has stated in the article that in spite of several representations pointing to the untruths in the article, the paper has not published an apology.The Hindu (Tamil) published an apology admitting that the contents of the (above-mentioned) article on Vanchinathan contained unverified false information and regretted for its publication.

For the first time in the history of independent India, a Dalit group paid floral tributes to Ashe. “Since this great Briton was against untouchability and recognised the Dalits as human beings even when the caste-ridden society took all-out measures to oppress them, we pay floral tributes to the slain Collector,” justified members of Aathi Thamizhar Katchi.

References

External links
  Press Information Bureau
  Times of India-Nov 2009
 Vanchinathan Statue at Sengottai

People from Tirunelveli district
1911 deaths
1886 births
Indian assassins
Suicides by firearm in India